STVS (Surinaamse Televisie Stichting) is a television network in Suriname and was founded in 1965 by Prime Minister Johan Adolf Pengel. It broadcasts in the Dutch language and it is owned by the government. It is headquartered in Paramaribo, Suriname. The picture format of the STVS television network is 480i (SDTV).

History
Television was first trialed in Suriname in 1958, at the Kersten firm in Paramaribo. On 24 February 1964, the Surinamese government founded the Surinaamse Televisie Stichting (STVS) and ordered the construction of a studio. The studio was opened on 1 October 1965, and on the same day trial broadcasts were started. Regular broadcasts started on 20 October 1965. First director of STVS was Frits Pengel, who had taken a television broadcasting course in the Netherlands. Pengel would remain director of STVS until 1994.

References

External links

Television stations in Suriname
Publicly funded broadcasters
Companies of Suriname